Mount Guyot is a high mountain summit in the Front Range of the Rocky Mountains of North America. The mountain was named in honor of Arnold Henry Guyot, a Swiss-American geologist.

See also

List of Colorado mountain ranges
List of Colorado mountain summits
List of Colorado fourteeners
List of Colorado 4000 meter prominent summits
List of the most prominent summits of Colorado
List of Colorado county high points

References

External links

Guyot
Guyot
Guyot
Guyot
Great Divide of North America